Shurtleff v. City of Boston, 596 U.S. ___ (2022), was a United States Supreme Court case related to the First Amendment to the United States Constitution. The case concerned the City of Boston's program that allowed groups to have their flags flown outside Boston City Hall. In a unanimous 9–0 decision, the Court ruled that the city violated a Christian group's free speech rights when it denied their request to raise a Christian flag over City Hall.

Background 
Under an application process, Boston, Massachusetts allowed groups to have their flags raised over one of the three flagpoles outside Boston City Hall. Flags that the city had approved ranged from those of other nations, to those celebrating the observance of Juneteenth.

A Christian group, Camp Constitution, and its director Hal Shurtleff applied to have the city fly a Christian flag over City Hall on Constitution Day in 2017. The group's mission is "to enhance the understanding of the country’s Judeo-Christian moral heritage". The city denied their application, the first denial of about 284 applications, on concerns that it would violate the Establishment Clause as government speech by signaling that the city was endorsing a particular religion. This was the first request that the city ever received to raise a religious flag during its program. Shurtleff then sued the city for violating his free speech rights.

After the city prevailed in both the district court and the United States Court of Appeals for the First Circuit, Shurtleff appealed to the Supreme Court. In the meantime, the city discontinued accepting flag raising applications.

Supreme Court 

Certiorari was granted in the case on September 30, 2021. On May 2, 2022, the Court unanimously ruled that the City of Boston violated the First Amendment by denying Shurtleff's application to fly the flag.

The majority decision was written by Justice Stephen Breyer. He concluded that "the city's lack of meaningful involvement in the selection of flags or the crafting of their messages leads us to classify the flag raisings as private, not government, speech".

Justice Brett Kavanaugh wrote a one-paragraph concurring opinion to emphasize that a government does not violate the Establishment Clause when it treats religious persons or organizations equally with secular ones, but a government does violate the Free Speech Clause when it excludes religious persons or organizations.

Justice Samuel Alito wrote another concurring opinion, disagreeing with Breyer's analysis and that the simplest test in these type of cases is "whether the government is actually expressing its own views or the real speaker is a private party."

Justice Neil Gorsuch also filed a concurring opinion, writing that the city relied erroneously on the 1971 ruling in Lemon v. Kurtzman and the subsequent "Lemon test", which had been used to evaluate such government actions within the scope of the Establishment Clause but had been falling out of favor by the Court in the years prior. The Court would later officially overturn Lemon about eight weeks later on June 27, 2022, in its ruling in Kennedy v. Bremerton School District, with Gorsuch writing the majority opinion.

Reactions 
After the ruling, a spokesperson for Boston mayor Michelle Wu stated that they will review the court's decision. The Satanic Temple nevertheless submitted a request to fly their flag for "Satanic Appreciation Week" from July 23–29.

The Biden administration and the American Civil Liberties Union sided with the Christian group. The administration said that "The city cannot generally open its flagpole to flags from private civic and social groups while excluding otherwise similar groups with religious views".

References

External Links 

 

2022 in United States case law
United States Supreme Court cases of the Roberts Court
United States Supreme Court cases
United States Free Speech Clause case law